Joanne Bromfield (born 12 October 1982) is a British freestyle skier. She competed in the women's moguls event at the 2002 Winter Olympics.

References

External links
 

1982 births
Living people
British female freestyle skiers
Olympic freestyle skiers of Great Britain
Freestyle skiers at the 2002 Winter Olympics
People from Lurgan
Sportspeople from County Armagh